General is a four Star general officer rank in the Bangladesh Army. It is the highest achieved rank in the Bangladesh Army. General ranks above the Three Star rank of Lieutenant general. The rank is denoted as a full-fledged General to extricate subordinate officers - Lieutenant general and Major general which are also general officers.

The rank was established in 2007 when Moeen U Ahmed was promoted to this rank.  Only the Chief of Army Staff (CAS) of Bangladesh Army gets this rank.

The current General and CAS of Bangladesh Army is General SM Shafiuddin Ahmed.

Insignia 
The badges of this rank have a Crossed sword and two batons below the Shapla Emblem. The general has red gorget patches with four golden stars to represent the four star rank.

Appointment and Term Length 
The position is appointed by The Prime Minister of The People's Republic of Bangladesh with the advice and consent of the President of Bangladesh. The maximum length of the term is 3 years or at the age of 60 of the holder, whichever is earlier.

List of Generals 
General M. A. G Osmani
General Mustafizur Rahman
General Moeen U Ahmed
General Md Abdul Mubeen
General Iqbal Karim Bhuiyan
General Belal Shafiul Huq
General Aziz Ahmed
General SM Shafiuddin Ahmed

See also 
Chief of Army Staff (Bangladesh)
List of serving generals of the Bangladesh Army
Military ranks of Bangladesh

References 

Bangladesh Army generals
Military ranks of Bangladesh